Kristaps Zīle (born 24 December 1997) is a Latvian professional ice hockey defenceman currently playing for HC Litvínov of the Czech Extraliga (ELH).

Playing career
Zīle started his junior career in Latvia and joined Dinamo Riga youth club HK Riga of MHL in 2014. Next season on January 17, 2016 he made his KHL debut in 4:2 win against Admiral Vladivostok. He is signed with Dinamo Riga through 2019.

International play
Zīle represented Latvia on junior level. He was selected by Bob Hartley for 2018 world championships roster. He made his WC debut on opening game against Norway.

Career statistics

Regular season and playoffs

International

References

External links
 

1997 births
Living people
HK Riga players
Dinamo Riga players
Latvian ice hockey defencemen
Ice hockey players at the 2022 Winter Olympics
Olympic ice hockey players of Latvia
Örebro HK players
Ice hockey people from Riga